Souk El Saffajine (Arabic: سوق السفاجين) is one of the markets of the medina of Sfax that no longer exists.

Localization 
Souk El Saffajine used to be located in the alley between Souk El Trouk and Souk Al Balghajine.

Speciality 
This Souk used to be for making and selling Tunisian desserts called Saffej, thus the name of the souk.

References 

El Saffagine